The World Cocoa Foundation is a non-profit membership organization with 100 member companies, including chocolate manufacturers like Nestlé, The Hershey Company and Mars, Inc. cocoa producers and suppliers such as Barry Callebaut, Olam International and Cargill, shipping companies and ports and retailers such as Starbucks.  The World Cocoa Foundation (WCF) represents 80% of the global corporate market. Members are private companies from the chocolate industry.  The WCF's charter is broadly stated as energizing public-private partnerships to achieve cocoa sustainability and faces challenges such as child labour in cocoa production, cocoa farming-related deforestation and extreme poverty impacting many of the West African cocoa smallholder farmers.

History
The World Cocoa Foundation had its roots as a 1995 initiative of the Chocolate Manufacturer's Association (CMA) called the International Cocoa Research and Education Foundation, which was later renamed the World Cocoa Foundation on August 14, 2000. The CMA itself was later dissolved in 2008 and became part of the National Confectioners Association. From 2001 to 2012, the World Cocoa Foundation administered projects supported in part by funding from United States Agency for International Development.  In 2009 the World Cocoa Foundation was selected to administer a $23 million grant by the Bill and Melinda Gates Foundation aimed at increasing farming household incomes through improved farmer crop productivity, better cocoa quality and crop diversification.  In 2014, a follow-on grant of $8.9 million by the Gates Foundation was also aimed at improving the livelihoods of West African farmers.

Initiatives
The World Cocoa Foundation has initiated or joined a number of initiatives since its formation, including the following:

CocoaAction
The CocoaAction initiative began in June 2014 and ended in 2019. It was a voluntary cocoa sustainability initiative led by a number of the world's leading cocoa and chocolate companies. The World Cocoa Foundation acts to align the individual sustainability efforts of those companies. Originally numbering 12 participating companies, including Archer Daniels Midland (ADM), as of 2019 there were 9 companies participating in CocoaAction: Barry Callebaut, Blommer Chocolate Company, Cargill, Ferrero, The Hershey Company, Mars, Inc., Mondelez International, Nestlé and Olam International. These are the "world's largest cocoa and chocolate companies" working through CocoaAction "to coordinate their cocoa sustainability efforts" starting with Côte d'Ivoire and Ghana. In 2018, WCF launched CocoaAction Brasil acting in a capacity similar to its role in West Africa sustainability efforts. CocoaAction aims to increase cocoa production dramatically by encouraging tree-crop smallholders to join cooperatives to improve their opportunities for access to fertilizers and to training on the proper use of fertilizers and pruning.

Building upon the WCF's CocoaAction initiative, in 2015 the Jacobs Foundation committed $52 million to "Transforming Education in Cocoa Communities (TRECC)". In April 2020, concerned that the COVID-19 pandemic would seriously impact West African cocoa farming populations already at the poverty line, an additional education initiative called The Child Learning and Education Facility was launched in the fight against child labor in Cote d'Ivoire.  This initiative was funded by the Jacobs Foundation, other foundations and World Cocoa Foundation members The Hershey Company, Olam International, Nestle and other industry concerns and backed by the Ivorian government.

Cocoa & Forest Initiative
In 2018, the World Cocoa Foundation launched the Cocoa & Forests Initiative with support from The Prince of Wales. The Cocoa & Forests Initiative joins the governments of Ghana, Cote d'Ivoire and Colombia, and thirty-five chocolate and cocoa manufacturers such as founding members The Hershey Company, Nestle and Mondelez International. They added to their previous forest replanting efforts and joined the World Cocoa Foundation reporting under this plan.  Two cornerstones of this initiative are farm mapping and tree distribution to increase canopy. While the World Cocoa Foundation reported progress had been made in the first four years of this initiative, environmentalist Mighty Earth reported room for improvement.

Ivory Coast

The global cocoa sector has invested millions of dollars in an attempt to reach their goal of doubling Côte d'Ivoire's cocoa production. Côte d'Ivoire depends on its cocoa industry as a major part of its exports. According to the cocoa industry, the small-acreage, low-technology, low-yield, no-fertilizer, family cocoa farms could potentially double their production if modern methods were used. Over the decades, tens of thousands of people set up small, traditional, subsistence cocoa farms in what are now, protected forested areas, such as Côte d'Ivoire's 34,000-hectare Mont Péko National Park where their forest-clearing threatened the dwindling numbers of elephants and chimpanzees. The World Cocoa Foundation's president, Richard Scobey, argued that higher-yield cocoa plantations would "take the pressure off the kind of expansion into protected forest areas that we've seen". The United Nations warns of a humanitarian crisis as the 51,000 people removed from the park, who have lost their livelihood, are now facing food shortages.

References

Agricultural organizations based in the United States
Chocolate industry
Food industry trade groups
Organizations based in Washington, D.C.